Marcel Boll (15 September 1886, Paris – 12 August 1971, Paris) was a French positivist, educationalist who played a prominent role in promoting the Vienna Circle in France. He was professor of Chemistry and Electricity at HEC Paris.

He edited works by Rudolf Carnap, Phillip Frank, Hans Reichenbach, and Moritz Schlick in France (the translations as such were made by others).

References

1886 births
1971 deaths
French sociologists
Educators from Paris
Positivists
Scientists from Paris
Vienna Circle
Academic staff of HEC Paris